Tori Junction, station code TORI, is the railway station serving the city of Chandwa which is the connecting point of Latehar and Hazaribag districts. It also connects  belongs to the South Eastern Railway zone of the Indian Railways.

History
Now the distance between Ranchi and New Delhi got shorter via Lohardaga. It is 90 km less distance between Ranchi and Delhi as compared to via Barkakana and Muri. One passenger train is running between Ranchi and Tori via Lohardaga.
This is one of the major junctions that will connect Ranchi and Hazaribag districts of Jharkhand. The ongoing construction work of Tori–Balumath–Shivpur–Kathotia (Hazaribagh) railway line which section is falling under the South Eastern Railway (Ranchi Division) and East Central Railway (Dhanbad Division) jurisdictions, would be completed, till Balumath. After completing this line Tori will be the major junction connecting Ranchi, Barkakana, Hazaribagh and Medininagar.

Facilities 
The major facilities available are waiting rooms, retiring room, computerized reservation facility, reservation counter, vehicle parking, etc.

Platforms
The platforms are interconnected with foot overbridge (FOB).
Tori Junction has 5 platforms.

Trains 
Several electrified local passenger trains also run from Barwadih to neighbouring destinations on frequent intervals.

Nearest airports
The nearest airports to Tori station are:
 Birsa Munda Airport, Ranchi  
 Gaya Airport, Gaya 
 Lok Nayak Jayaprakash Airport, Patna 
 Netaji Subhash Chandra Bose International Airport, Kolkata

See also 
 
 
 Barwadih
 Latehar
 Palamau

References

External links 
 Latehar district

Railway stations in Latehar district
Railway junction stations in Jharkhand